Łuczak is a Polish surname. Notable people with the surname include:

Czesław Łuczak (1922–2002), Polish historian
Jan-Marco Luczak (born 1975), German lawyer and politician
Jerzy Luczak-Szewczyk (1923–1975), Polish-Swedish artist
Krystian Łuczak (born 1949), Polish politician
Krzysztof Łuczak (born 1975), Polish long jumper
Malwina Łuczak, Polish-Australian mathematician
Mieczysław Marcin Łuczak (born 1955), Polish politician
Olivia Luczak (born 1981), Polish-German boxer
Peter Luczak (born 1979), Polish-Australian tennis player
Tomasz Łuczak (born 1963), Polish mathematician
Wojciech Łuczak (born 1989), Polish footballer

See also
 

Polish-language surnames